The International University College of Turin, or IUC Turin, is an independent University founded in 2006 with a grant from  the Compagnia di San Paolo and Consiglio Nazionale del Notariato. Teaching at IUC focuses on the interdisciplinary and critical study of law, economics and finance. The IUC is located in the center of the city of Turin, Italy. The Founding President of IUC is Franzo Grande Stevens. Stefano Rodotà served as President until 2014. The current  President is Edoardo Reviglio.

Purpose and programme

The reported aim of the IUC is to further the study of global capitalism and the preparation of an international class of lawyers and finance experts, with a critical policy orientation. The IUC offers a two-year Master of Science in Comparative Law, Economics and Finance (MSc CLEF) degree. Starting in academic year 2010–11, the IUC also offers a one-year LL.M. degree whose title is jointly offered together with University of Turin,  University of Eastern Piedmont and Carlo Alberto College.  
In Academic Year 2016-2017, after its first ten years of existence, IUC offered an entirely newly designed Master of Research in Food Law and Finance. The program, in English, deployed a highly interdisciplinary approach to the Food Chain and its financialization. The degree was granted jointly with the Università Scienze Gastronomiche, established in Pollenzo by Slow Food. The degree program was discontinued in 2018 but the study of the global food chain became part of the general curriculum. A special focus of teaching and research at IUC has traditionally been the study and active defence of water and the commons.

The IUC is a center for the interdisciplinary and critical study of law, economics, finance and the commons. Teachers and students from all over the world (since 2008, over 300 students from 66 countries) gather in Turin to examine the phenomenon of globalization with a particular attention to the conception of achievable long-period policies to govern its effects. To do so, research at the IUC explores the great variety of financial and institutional settings across the world in their analogies and differences to obtain a more realistic and scientific grasp on current global transformations. A successful example of this approach is the IUC Report "At the End of the End of History. Global Legal Standards: Part of the Solution or Part of the Problem?", which was presented at the Seminar "Global Standards in the 21st Century" organized by the G-8 Presidency in Rome in May 2009. The Report calls for a broader understanding of markets and the structural impact of legal institutions on their unfolding needs, and issues a challenge to the biases produced by mainstream theory, while proposing innovative solutions for the harms caused by the recent financial and economic crisis.
The teaching and scholarly interest for the commons as an institutional setting for a more ecologically compatible anthropocene has been the most recognisable trademark of IUC. More than 95% of IUC Alumni have received the sort of financial aid that equals free education, allowing the IUC to be one of the few really accessible global institutions of higher education.

Faculty and academic partnership

The faculty at IUC is a mix of younger academics on a full-time basis and of stellar Associate faculty collaborators including Guido Calabresi (former Dean of the Yale Law School), Duncan Kennedy (Harvard Law School), Joseph Halevi, (Emeritus of Sidney University), Jan Toporowsky (SOAS), Gunther Frankenberg (Frankfurt).  Additionally, Gunther Teubner (Goethe University Frankfurt) held a Jean Monnet "ad personam" chair at the International University College of Turin from 2011 to 2013, and served for 2 years as an Academic Coordinator. Former Greek Finance Minister Yanis Varoufakis is an Honorary Professor at IUC. Slow Food Founder Carlo Petrini received an Honoris Causa Master of Research at IUC in 2012 and now serves as one of the Directors of the new Food Law and Finance project. The tenth anniversary of IUC was celebrated in January 2017 with a distinguished lecture given by ecologist and system theorist Fritjof Capra.    
The funding and current IUC Academic Coordinator is Ugo Mattei, full Professor at the universities of California Hastings and Turin. The Director is Giuseppe Mastruzzo PhD.

IUC Turin has partnerships, for student and academic exchanges, with the following universities:

 University of Fribourg
 Universidad Pompeu Fabra
 UC Hastings College of the Law
 Lanzhou University
 Universidad de Chile
 Universidad Torcuato di Tella
 Universidad Nacional Mayor de San Marcos
 Université de Bamako, Mali
 National Law School of India University
 Universidad San Francisco Xavier de Chuquisaca (Sucre, Bolivia)
 University of Eastern Piedmont "Amedeo Avogadro", Faculty of Law

Campus

The IUC Torino campus is located in the center of Torino, adjacent to the Torino Porta Nuova railway station, the Torino Metro, and Piazza Carlo Felice (one of the central squares of Torino).

Notes and references

External links
 IUC Turin - Official website
 "Common Core of European Private Law" website
 IUC Student Association website

Schools in Turin
Universities in Piedmont
Business schools in Italy
Law schools in Italy
Legal research institutes
Educational institutions established in 2006
2006 establishments in Italy